Gundlupet Assembly constituency is one of the 224 electoral constituencies that form the Karnataka Legislative Assembly in the south-Indian state of Karnataka. The constituency was formed in 1957 after Mysore State was reorganized as the result of States Reorganisation Act, 1956. , thirteen elections have been held in the constituency for electing the Member of Karnataka Legislative Assembly and only three candidates have been elected. While K. S. Nagarathanamma won the first election of 1957, she went on to be elected six more times. H. K. Shivarudrappa won in 1978 and since 1994 H. S. Mahadeva Prasad has won the seat five times consecutively. Following Mahadeva Prasad's death on 3 January 2017, the by election of Gundlupet Assembly constituency in 2017 was won by M. C. Mohan Kumari Urf Geetha.

Members of Legislative Assembly

Election results

1957 
The polling was held on 25 February 1957 in this constituency with two contestants. Out of 52,255 eligible electors turnout was 38,008 with no invalid votes. INC won 150 seats and emerged as the largest party.

1962 
The polling was held on 19 February 1962 in this constituency with two contestants. Out of 59,147 eligible electors turnout was 45,239 of which 42,775 cast valid votes (rejection 5.45%). INC won 138 seats and emerged as the largest party.

1967 
The polling was held on 21 February 1967 in this constituency with two contestants. Out of 63,773 eligible electors 43,139 was turnout of which 40,133 cast valid votes (rejection 6.97%). INC won 126 seats and formed the state government.

1972 
The polling was held on 5 March 1972 in this constituency with two contestants after other two had withdrawn. Out of 73,868 eligible electors 37,275 were males and 36,593 females. The total turnout was 52,246 of which 50,310 cast valid votes (rejection 3.71%). INC won 165 seats and emerged as the largest party.

1978 
The polling was held on 25 February 1978 in this constituency over 120 polling stations. Out of 85,101 eligible electors 42,748 were males and 42,353 females. The total turnout was 70,648 of which 68,630 cast valid votes (rejection 2.86%). INC won 149 seats and emerged as the largest party.

1983 
The polling was held on 1 May 1983 in this constituency over 120 polling stations. Out of 91,782 eligible electors 46,089 were males and 45,693 females. The total turnout was 72,344 of which 70,587 cast valid votes (rejection 2.43%). Although INC candidate won this constituency, the Janata Party won the majority throughout the state by winning 95 seats to form the government.

1985 
The polling was held on 3 May 1985 in this constituency over 140 polling stations with seven contestants participating. Out of 95,573 eligible electors 47,949 were males and 47,624 females. The total turnout was 68,619 of which 67,162 cast valid votes (rejection 2.12%). Although INC candidate won this constituency, the Janata Party won the majority throughout the state by winning 139 seats to form the government.

1989 
The polling was held on 24 November 1989 in this constituency over 165 polling stations with seven contestants participating. Out of eligible 123,021 electors 62,043 were males and 60,978 females. The total turnout was 95,451 of which 88,760 cast valid votes (rejection 7.01%). INC candidate won this constituency and the party went to form the state government winning overall 178 seats.

1994 
The polling was held on 26 November 1994 in this constituency over 187 polling stations with nine contestants participating. Out of eligible 134,464 electors were 67,631 males and 66,833 females. With eight votes being cast through post, the total turnout was 108,138 of which 105,686 were valid votes (rejection 2.27%). JD candidate won this constituency and the party went to form the state government winning overall  115 seats.

1999 
The polling was held on 11 September 1999 in this constituency over 187 polling stations with four contestants participating after ten contestants had withdrawn. The vote counting took place on 6 October with results being declared on the following day. Out of eligible 145,329 electors 72,605 were males and 72,724 females. With 33 votes being cast through post, the total turnout was 110,975 of which 103,330 were valid votes (rejection 6.89% ). Although a JD(U) candidate won this constituency, INC won 132 seats overall and went to form the state government.

2004 
The polling was held on 26 April 2004 in this constituency over 178 polling stations with five contestants participating. The vote counting took place on 13 May with results being declared on the same day. Out of eligible 155,793 electors 78,037 were males and 77,756 females. With 314 votes being cast through post, the total turnout was 120,910 of which 120,880 were valid votes (rejection 2.48% ). Although Bharatiya Janata Party won the highest of 79 seats, INC with 65 seats and JD(S) with 58 seats formed the coalition government.

2008 
The polling was held on 10 May 2008 in this constituency over 211 polling stations with five contestants participating. The vote counting took place on 25 May with results being declared on the same day. Out of eligible 176,750 electors 89,571 were males and 87,179 females. With 392 votes being cast through post, the total turnout was 143,733 of which 143,562 were valid votes (rejection 0.12% ). Although an INC candidate won this constituency, BJP won 110 seats overall and went to form the state government.

2013 
The polling was held on 5 May 2013 in this constituency over 242 polling stations with ten contestants participating after two contestants had withdrawn. The vote counting took place on 8 May with results being declared on 11 May. Out of eligible 190,425 electors 95,589 were males, 94,831 females and 5 others. With 890 votes being cast through post, the total turnout was 162,443 of which 162,326 were valid votes (rejection 0.08% ). INC won 122 seats overall and went to form the state government.

Voting patterns

References 

Assembly constituencies of Karnataka
Chamarajanagar district